Nusrat Jahan Diana is a Bangladeshi actress. She is notable for her roles in television drama serials including Alta-Sundori and Rakkhosi.

She started as a billboard model. In 2007, she made her TV debut in Debashish Biswas's Chithi.

Works 
Television

Films
 Jaago (2010)
 Guerrilla (2011)

References 

Bangladeshi film actresses
1984 births
Living people
Bangladeshi television actresses
21st-century Bangladeshi actresses